Mała Ślęza is a river of Poland, a tributary of the Ślęza near Bartoszowa.

Rivers of Poland
Rivers of Lower Silesian Voivodeship